The Villainess is a 2017 South Korean action thriller film directed by Jung Byung-gil, starring Kim Ok-vin. The film had its world premiere at the 70th Cannes Film Festival in May 2017.

According to the director and writer, the movie was inspired by the European film La Femme Nikita (1990), which he had seen at the age of 10.

Plot
Sook-hee, a highly skilled assassin, enters a hallway and kills numerous people before being surrounded by cops and smiling a grim smile. Later, Sook-Hae is drugged and taken to South Korea's intelligence agency, where they provide her plastic surgery. To give her a new start, they also fake her death and assign her a new name: Chae Yeon-soo. 

Yeon-soo learns that she is pregnant and offers her freedom if she trains with them and works as an agent for 10 years. She accepts and while in training, gives birth to a daughter, Eun-hye. Having completed her first assignment, Yeon-soo is given an apartment to share with her daughter Eun-hye. Unknown to Yeon-soo, Kwon-sook places an agent named Jung Hyun-soo in the apartment next door, and is to befriend Yeon-soo and keep tabs on her. After a few meetings, Yeon-soo and Hyun-soo fall for each other. Later, the agency's leader Kwon-sook sends Yeon-soo on her first "assignment". The target she kills turns out to be the father of a young girl. This triggers the memories of her past

Past: A 7 year old Sook-Hae witnesses her father's death committed by a mysterious killer, but Sook-hee does not get a look at the killer's face; she only hears him whistling an eerie tune. Years later, Sook-Hae tries to kill Jang-Chun, a man with yellow teeth believing him to be her father's killer, but gets captured and beaten. While beating her, Jang-Chun tells her he did not kill her father. Later, Jang-Chun enters the room, and sells Sook-hee to a prostitution ring. She is about to be assaulted by a client when a person named Lee Joong-sang arrives and rescues her, while also killing Jang-Chun.

Joong-sang decides to train Sook-hee to be a killing machine, and she becomes devoted to him. Sook-hee and Joong-sang get married. She says that she is willing to let go of her thirst for revenge if she can get married and live a normal life. Seeing that his trained assassin would no longer be of much use, Joong-sang sets up an act. While on their honeymoon, Joong-sang fakes saving a gang member called Choi Chun-Mo and stages his own death. When Sook-hee learns about Joong-sang's "death", she goes on a killing rampage and takes out a whole gang that was known to hate Joong-sang. Joong-sang expects her to die killing his rivals, but they are no match to her.

Present: While on a mission with another agent named Min-ju, Yeon-soo is caught stealing a phone, where Min-ju is killed in the ensuing fight. The stolen phone contains documents about Choi Chun-Mo and the agency is worried that since Yeon-soo knew him, she may be a double-agent. Hyun-soo comforts her and this brings them closer together. The agency wants Yeon-soo to kill her next target from a wedding catering company, so they arrange a wedding between her and Hyun-soo. While holding the target at gunpoint, Yeon-soo aims a rifle out a window and finds out her target is Joong-sang. 

Shocked that he is still alive, she fails to kill him. Joong-sang backtracks the location from which the shots come and identifies Yeon-soo as Sook-hee. He meets her once again and reveals that Hyun-soo is actually an undercover agent. Joong-sang's gang meets Hyun-soo and Eun-hye. Hyun-soo reveals that Eun-hye is, in fact, Joong-sang's daughter, hoping for all the killings to stop, but Joong-sang tells that he does not care and plants a bomb near them. As Yeon-soo reaches her apartment, she watches the bomb go off. Hyun-soo and her daughter die. 

Consumed with revenge, Yeon-soo tracks down Joong-sang to a parking garage and kills a lot of his men. She confronts Joong-sang, who escapes to the street and meets with his remaining henchmen. They all speed off in a shuttle bus. Yeon-soo chases after them and boards the bus, where she finally holds an axe over Joong-sang's head, who puts his head down and starts whistling the same eerie tune, revealing that Joong-sang is her father's killer. Yeon-soo strikes him in the head with the axe. Before walking out of the wreckage with the police surrounding her, Yeon-soo smiles a grim smile.

Cast
 Kim Ok-vin as Sook-hee / Chae Yeon-soo
 Min Ye-ji as young Sook-hee
 Shin Ha-kyun as Lee Joong-sang
 Sung Joon as Jung Hyun-soo
 Kim Seo-hyung as Kwon-sook 
 Jo Eun-ji as Kim Sun  
 Lee Seung-joo as Choon-mo 
 Son Min-ji as Min-joo
 Kim Yeon-woo as Eun-hye

Cameo
 Jung Hae-kyun as Jang Chun
 Park Chul-min as Sook-hee's father 
 Kim Hye-na as training female rookie

Release
The Villainess was released in South Korean cinemas on June 8, 2017.

According to the distributor Next Entertainment World the film was sold prior to the local release to 115 countries including North America, South America, France, Germany, Spain, Italy, Australia, Taiwan and the Philippines. Later it was sold to additional territories which includes Japan, China, Singapore, India increasing to a total of 136 countries worldwide.

Reception
The Villainess received a four-minute standing ovation at Cannes Film Festival.

The film was also screened at the 16th New York Asian Film Festival which was held from June 30 to July 16, 2017. At the festival, the film received the Daniel E. Craft Award for Excellence in Action Cinema.

On review aggregator website Rotten Tomatoes, the film has an approval rating of 84% based on 85 reviews with an average rating of 6.84/10. The site's critical consensus reads, "The Villainess offers enough pure kinetic thrills to satisfy genre enthusiasts -- and carve out a bloody niche for itself in modern Korean action cinema." Review aggregator website Metacritic gave the film a rating of 64 out of 100, indicating "generally favorable reviews".

Awards and nominations

TV series
In July 2021, it was announced a TV series based on the film is in development with Amazon with writer Francisca Hu writing and executive producing the pilot.

References

External links
 
 

2017 films
South Korean action thriller films
2017 action thriller films
Next Entertainment World films
Girls with guns films
South Korean films about revenge
Films shot from the first-person perspective
Films directed by Jeong Byeong-gil
2010s South Korean films